David Connolly Hall (May 1, 1875 – May 27, 1972) was an American middle distance runner. He was born in Sherbrooke, Quebec, Canada and died in Seattle. He won the bronze medal in the 800 metres track and field race at the 1900 Summer Olympics in Paris. His time in the final is unknown. The race was won by Alfred Tysoe, who had taken second in the preliminary heat which Hall had won with a time of 1:59.0.

Hall also competed in the 1500 metres, placing fourth.

References

External links 

1875 births
1972 deaths
Sportspeople from Sherbrooke
Brown Bears men's track and field athletes
American male middle-distance runners
Athletes (track and field) at the 1900 Summer Olympics
Olympic bronze medalists for the United States in track and field
Medalists at the 1900 Summer Olympics
Anglophone Quebec people
Canadian emigrants to the United States